Juan Manuel Álvarez (born 12 April 1948) is a Mexican former footballer. He competed in the men's tournament at the 1972 Summer Olympics.

References

External links
 

1948 births
Living people
Mexico international footballers
Olympic footballers of Mexico
Footballers at the 1972 Summer Olympics
Footballers from Mexico City
Association football defenders
Mexican footballers